The 2010 SA Tennis Open was a tennis tournament played on hard courts indoors. It was the 19th edition of the SA Tennis Open and was part of the ATP World Tour 250 series of the 2010 ATP World Tour. It took place in Johannesburg, South Africa from 1 February through 7 February 2010.

ATP entrants

Seeds

 Rankings are as of 18 January 2010

Other entrants
The following players received wildcards into the singles main draw:
  Rik de Voest
  Raven Klaasen
  Izak van der Merwe

The following players received entry from the qualifying draw:
  Benjamin Balleret
  Noam Okun
  Filip Prpic
  Fritz Wolmarans

Finals

Singles

 Feliciano López defeated  Stéphane Robert, 7–5, 6–1
It was Lopez's first title of the year and second of his career.

Doubles

 Rohan Bopanna /  Aisam-ul-Haq Qureshi defeated  Karol Beck /  Harel Levy 6–2, 3–6, [10–5]

External links
Official website

 
SA Tennis Open
Sa Tennis Open, 2010
Sports competitions in Johannesburg
2010s in Johannesburg
February 2010 sports events in Africa